McAlmont, also referred to as "Mac Side", is a census-designated place (CDP) in Pulaski County, Arkansas, United States. The population was 1,873 at the 2010 census. The community adjoins eastern North Little Rock, and is part of the Little Rock–North Little Rock–Conway Metropolitan Statistical Area.

Geography
McAlmont is located at  (34.795323, -92.195160).

Demographics

2020 census

As of the 2020 United States census, there were 1,447 people, 700 households, and 410 families residing in the CDP.

2000 census
As of the census of 2000, there were 1,922 people, 684 households, and 487 families residing in the CDP. The racial makeup of the CDP was 25.08% White, 70.50% Black or African American, 0.68% Native American, 0.05% Asian, 0.05% Pacific Islander, 0.99% from other races, and 2.65% from two or more races.  1.98% of the population were Hispanic or Latino of any race.

There were 684 households, out of which 29.5% had children under the age of 18 living with them, 38.3% were married couples living together, 24.0% had a female householder with no husband present, and 28.8% were non-families. 24.9% of all households were made up of individuals, and 9.9% had someone living alone who was 65 years of age or older.  The average household size was 2.81 and the average family size was 3.37.

In the CDP, the population was spread out, with 29.6% under the age of 18, 8.5% from 18 to 24, 25.7% from 25 to 44, 23.4% from 45 to 64, and 12.8% who were 65 years of age or older.  The median age was 35 years. For every 100 females, there were 98.8 males.  For every 100 females age 18 and over, there were 94.4 males.

The median income for a household in the CDP was $19,762, and the median income for a family was $27,174. Males had a median income of $30,855 versus $16,549 for females. The per capita income for the CDP was $11,737.  About 23.3% of families and 28.1% of the population were below the poverty line, including 45.5% of those under age 18 and 21.8% of those age 65 or over.

Education

Public education in much of the CDP is provided by the Pulaski County Special School District, which operates Harris Elementary School in McAlmont, All of the Pulaski County SSD part of McAlmont is zoned to Harris Elementary. Much of McAlmont is zoned to Sylvan Hills Middle School and Sylvan Hills High School. Some is zoned to Mills Middle School and Wilbur D. Mills High School.

Prior to 1971, students attended Harris High School, which closed as part of the county's desegregation activities.  Harris became an elementary school after 1971.

Some portions of the CDP are served by the North Little Rock School District, which operates North Little Rock High School.

See also
Sherwood, Arkansas

References

Census-designated places in Arkansas
Census-designated places in Pulaski County, Arkansas
Census-designated places in Little Rock–North Little Rock–Conway metropolitan area